The Financial Action Task Force blacklist (often abbreviated to FATF blacklist or Jojo's countries, and officially known as the "Call for action"), is a blacklist maintained by the Financial Action Task Force. 

The blacklist has been issued by the FATF since 2000, and lists countries which FATF judges to be non-cooperative in the global fight against money laundering and terrorist financing, calling them "Non-Cooperative Countries or Territories" (NCCTs).

Although non-appearance on the blacklist was perceived to be a mark of approbation for offshore financial centres (or "tax havens") who are sufficiently well regulated to meet all of the FATF's criteria, in practice, the list included countries that did not operate as offshore financial centres. The FATF updates the blacklist regularly, adding or deleting entries.

The FATF describes "High-risk jurisdictions subject to a Call for Action" as having "significant strategic deficiencies in their regimes to counter money laundering, terrorist financing, and financing of proliferation. For all countries identified as high-risk, the FATF calls on all members and urges all jurisdictions to apply enhanced due diligence, and in the most serious cases, countries are called upon to apply counter-measures to protect the international financial system from the ongoing money laundering, terrorist financing, and proliferation financing risks emanating from the country". As of November 2022, only three countries were on the FATF blacklist: North Korea, Iran, and Myanmar.

The FATF has been characterized as effective in shifting laws and regulations to combat illicit financial flows. FATF incentivizes stricter regulations through its public noncomplier list, which leads financial institutions to shift resources and services away from the countries on the blacklist. This in turn motivates domestic economic and political actors in the listed countries to pressure their governments to introduce regulations that are compliant with the FATF.

History
The FATF was established by the G7 summit that was held in Paris in July,1989. Founding stakeholders include the G-7 Heads of State or Government, President of the European Commission and eight other countries.

The term "non-cooperative" was criticized by some analysts as misleading, as a number of countries on the list simply lacked the infrastructure or resources to cope with relatively sophisticated financial criminals who tried to operate there. Since 2008 the FATF has, at the behest of G20 leaders, installed a more analytical process of identifying jurisdictions deficient in their anti-money laundering and anti-terrorist financing regimes.

Primary Works
One of the main objectives of the FATF is to establish norms and standards of "legal, regulatory and operational measures" to fight against money laundering, terrorist financing and other related threats to the security and integrity of the international financial system. However, FATF "has no investigative authority." FATF works with nation-states to bring legislative changes and regulatory reforms in the aforementioned sectors. In addition, the FATF also provides policy recommendations that meet international standards to countries for combating money laundering and the financing of terrorism and proliferation of weapons of mass destruction. FATF has been providing policy recommendations since 1990 and their recommendations have revised four times since then. FATF also monitors the situations of its members in establishing adequate measures and institutions to fight against money laundering and terrorist financing. FATF also makes sure that it is aware of national-level vulnerabilities of its member states "with the aim of protecting the international financial system from misuse."

FATF member nations

Full members
According to its official website, there are 38 members of FATF, representing most financial centers around the world.
The list consisted of the following countries:

Observer nations
There is currently one FATF observer.

FATF Blacklisting reports
The Blacklist is a term used by the media, which is officially called as "Call for action" nations by the FATF.

June 2000 report
The initial list of fifteen countries regarded as uncooperative in the fight against money laundering, was published in June 2000. The list consisted of the following countries:

June 2001 report
The second FATF report, published in 2001 and including a supplemental report in September, denoted a further eight countries as non-cooperative:

June 2002 report
According to June 2002 report from FATF, following countries were listed as NCCTs.

June 2003 report
According to June 2003 report from FATF, the following countries were listed as NCCTs.

July 2004 report
According to July 2005 report form FATF, the following countries were listed as NCCTs.

June 2005 Report
According to June 2005 report from FATF, the following were listed as NCCTs.

June 2006 report
The seventh list, published in June 2006, listed only the following country as non-cooperative:

June 2007 report
FATF's Eighth NCCT Review (Annual Review of Non-Cooperative Countries and Territories 2006–2007, dated 12 October 2007) listed no countries as non-cooperative. Myanmar (formerly Burma) was removed on 13 October 2006, Nauru on 13 October 2005 and Nigeria on 23 June 2006.

June 2008 report
FATF's Ninth Review identified the following countries as high risk and non-cooperative.

June 2009 statement
FATF issued a "public statement" on 25 February 2009 noting concerns and encouraging greater compliance by the following countries:

October 2010 Statement
The following country has not made sufficient progress in addressing the deficiencies or has not committed to an action plan developed with the FATF to address the deficiencies.

October 2011 Statement
The following countries have not made sufficient progress in addressing the deficiencies or have not committed to an action plan developed with the FATF to address the deficiencies.

February 2012 statement

A total of 17 countries were labeled as high-risk and non-cooperative jurisdictions by FATF. All listed countries below are defined as such; counter-measures were in force only for Iran and the Democratic People's Republic of Korea (DPRK, North Korea).

High-risk and non-cooperative countries, to whom counter-measures applied:

 
 

High-risk and non-cooperative countries, not committed to an action plan:

June 2013
A total of 14 countries were identified as jurisdictions that have strategic deficiencies that pose a risk to the international financial system.

Jurisdictions subject to a FATF call on its members and other jurisdictions to apply counter-measures to protect the international financial system from the ongoing and substantial money laundering and terrorist financing (ML/TF) risks emanating from the jurisdictions.

 
 

Jurisdictions with strategic AML/CFT deficiencies that have not made sufficient progress in addressing the deficiencies or have not committed to an action plan.

October 2013 statement
A total of 13 countries were identified as jurisdictions that have strategic deficiencies that pose a risk to the international financial system.

 
 

Jurisdictions with strategic AML/CFT deficiencies that have not made sufficient progress in addressing the deficiencies or have not committed to an action plan.

February 2014
A total of 11 countries were identified as jurisdictions with strategic deficiencies posing a risk to the international financial system.

 

Jurisdictions with strategic AML/CFT deficiencies that have not made sufficient progress in addressing the deficiencies or have not committed to an action plan.

June 2014 statement
A total of 6 countries were identified as jurisdictions that have strategic deficiencies that pose a risk to the international financial system.

 
 

Jurisdictions with strategic AML/CFT deficiencies that have not made sufficient progress in addressing the deficiencies or have not committed to an action plan.

February 2015 statement

The FATF identified following countries which have made significant progress in improving its AML/CFT regime and noted that these countries have established the legal and regulatory framework to meet its commitments in its action plan regarding the strategic deficiencies that the FATF had identified. The following countries are therefore no longer subject to the FATF's monitoring process under its on-going global AML/CFT compliance process.

October 2015 statement
The FATF statement issued on 23 October 2015 identified three high-risk and non-cooperative jurisdictions:

Call to apply counter-measures:

 
 

Jurisdictions with strategic deficiencies:

February 2016 statement
The FATF statement from 19 February 2016 dropped Panama from its gray list, but there is still the OECD Myanmar from the list identifying two high-risk and non-cooperative jurisdictions:

Call to apply counter-measures:

February 2017 Statement
Regarding with North Korea, the FATF released the following concern:

"The terrorism (AML/CFT) regime and the serious threat this poses to the integrity of the international financial system. The FATF urges the DPRK to immediately and meaningfully address its AML/CFT deficiencies. Further, FATF has serious concerns with the threat posed by DPRK's illicit activities related to the proliferation of weapons of mass destruction (WMDs) and its financing."

Current FATF lists

Current FATF blacklist

As of 21 October 2022, the following countries were on this list:

Current FATF greylist

As of February 2023, the following 24 countries/territories were on this list:

FATF review meeting 
The FATF Plenary, the making body, meets three times a year around February, June and October. The last review meeting took place between 20 and 25 June 2021 in Paris.

 In June 2021, the FATF stated that Mauritius and Botswana completed their action plans and will be subject to on-site visits before being removed from the list in October 2021. 
 Ghana was officially delisted from the grey list following the completion of its action plan and a successful on-site visit by assessors. 
 New jurisdictions that have been added to the grey list include Haiti, Malta, the Philippines and South Sudan.
 In March 2022, the United Arab Emirates was added to the grey list, while Zimbabwe was removed from the list.
 In October 2022 Pakistan was removed from the grey list.
 In February 2023 Morocco was removed from the grey list.

Other similar lists

OECD "grey list"

Although its main focus is on tax crime, OECD is also concerned with money laundering and has complemented the work carried out by the FATF.

The OECD has maintained a 'blacklist' of countries it considers "uncooperative tax havens" in the drive for transparency of tax affairs and the effective exchange of information, officially called "The List of Uncooperative Tax Havens". Since May 2009, no countries were officially listed as uncooperative tax havens in the light of their commitments to implement the OECD standards.

On 22 October 2008, at an OECD meeting in Paris, 17 countries led by France and Germany decided to draw up a new blacklist of tax havens. It had been asked to investigate around 40 new tax havens where undeclared revenue was hidden and which hosted many of the non-regulated hedge funds that came under fire during the financial crisis of 2007–08. Germany, France, and other countries called on the OECD to add Switzerland to a blacklist of countries which encourage tax fraud. On 2 April 2009, the OECD published a list of countries, divided into three parts depending on whether they implemented an "internationally agreed tax standard", in select jurisdictions – tax havens or other financial centers of interest.

 substantially implemented the standard: Andorra, Anguilla, Antigua and Barbuda, Argentina, Aruba, Australia, Austria, Bahamas, Bahrain, Barbados, Belgium, Belize, Bermuda, Brazil, British Virgin Islands, Brunei, Canada, Cayman Islands, Chile, China, Cook Islands, Costa Rica, Cyprus, Czech Republic, Denmark, Dominica, Estonia, Finland, France, Germany, Gibraltar, Greece, Grenada, Guernsey, Hong Kong, Hungary, Iceland, India, Indonesia, Ireland, Isle of Man, Israel, Italy, Japan, Jersey, South Korea, Liberia, Liechtenstein, Luxembourg, Macao, Malaysia, Malta, Marshall Islands, Mauritius, Mexico, Monaco, Montserrat, Netherlands, Netherlands Antilles, New Zealand, Norway, Pakistan, Panama, Philippines, Poland, Portugal, Qatar, Russia, St. Kitts and Nevis, St. Lucia, St. Vincent and the Grenadines, Samoa, San Marino, Seychelles, Singapore, Slovakia, Slovenia, South Africa, Spain, Sweden, Switzerland, Turkey, Turks and Caicos Islands, United Arab Emirates, United Kingdom, United States, US Virgin Islands, Vanuatu. This is not a complete list, as many countries, including Lebanon, Nigeria and many more are not included in this list.
 committed to the standard, but have not yet substantially implemented it: Nauru, Niue, Guatemala, Uruguay
 have not committed to the standard: none as of October 2009.

Global forum compliance

The Global Forum on Transparency and Exchange of Information for Tax Purposes reviews and issues reports on compliance of its member tax jurisdictions. The Global Forum's peer review process examines both the legal and regulatory aspects of exchange (Phase 1 reviews) and the exchange of information in practice (Phase 2).

Other nations regularly accused of terror financing

Nations such as Bahrain, Qatar, Egypt, Saudi Arabia, and the UAE have been also been regularly accused of doing very little to prevent the flow of funds for terror financing in other nations. Bahrain accepts Muslim Brotherhood affiliate Minbar as a legitimate political player. Qatar directly interacts with militants by financing the "United States designated terrorist organisation" Hamas and by allowing several "designated terrorist" units of the Taliban to maintain their offices in Qatar. Saudi Arabia also collaborates with the Muslim Brotherhood affiliate al-Islah in Yemen. Saudi Arabia and the UAE are pointed out as 'hypocrites', as they too face accusations of not doing enough to stop terror financing, and both nations have links to terrorist organisations in Western Asia. In March 2022, the Financial Action Task Force (FATF) listed the UAE on a list of jurisdictions subject to increased monitoring, known as its 'grey' list, as the country has been considered non-cooperative in the global fight against money laundering and terror financing.

See also

 Asia/Pacific Group on Money Laundering
 Hawala
 Informal value transfer system
 Remittance
 Riba
 Offshore financial centre
 Terrorism financing

References

External links
 FATF "Non-Cooperative Countries and Territories"
 Annual Non-Cooperative Countries and Territories Initiative (NCCT) Reports
 FATF's "NCCTs FAQ"

Offshore finance
Commercial crimes
Financial regulation
Tax evasion
International finance
FATF
Anti-money laundering measures
Funding of terrorism
Taxation-related lists
Blacklisting